USS Persistent is a name used more than once by the United States Navy:

 , a coastal patrol yacht commissioned 16 October 1940.
 , a fleet minesweeper commissioned 3 February 1956.
 , a  that operated during the 1980s.

United States Navy ship names